Abdolhossein Hazhir (‎; 4 June 1902 – 5 November 1949) was an Iranian politician who served as the Prime Minister of Iran under Mohammad Reza Pahlavi in 1948, having been a minister 10 times. One of his posts was the minister of finance.

During Hazhir's premiership in 1948 his policies were harshly criticized by Ayatollah Kashani who was one of the clerics close to the Fada'iyan-e Islam's leader Navab Safavi. He was also subject to the criticisms of media outlets. One of them was a satirical magazine entitled Tawfiq which was closed by the government due to its frequent cartoons mocking Prime Minister Hazhir. In November 1949, while serving as minister of royal court, Hazhir was assassinated at the Sipah Salar Mosque, Tehran. The perpetrator was found to be Seyyed Hossein Emami Esfahani who was a member of Fada'iyan-e Islam, an Islamist militant organization led by Navab Safavi.

See also
List of prime ministers of Iran

References

External links

20th-century Iranian politicians
1902 births
1949 deaths
Government ministers of Iran
Prime Ministers of Iran
Assassinated Iranian politicians
People murdered in Iran
People assassinated by the Fada'iyan-e Islam
Victims of Islamic terrorism
Finance ministers of Iran